Matt "Starboy" Bowden is a rock musician and activist from New Zealand.  Previously known as the "Godfather of the legal highs industry", he is credited with creating non-lethal, non-addictive party pills as safer substitutes for methamphetamine addicts, and successfully lobbying in New Zealand for a quality control and regulatory system for psychoactive substances. He performs musically as Starboy and produces progressive rock music with elaborate theatrical stage shows, and produces short films, most notably Starboy Eternity.

His musical single Flying, released 29 October 2012, debuted at number five in the NZ Single charts and number 29 in the New Zealand Top 40 Singles charts.

As of July 2016, Matt Bowden relocated to Thailand, and then Europe to continue working in regulatory development after stating an intention to develop safer alternatives to liquor led to a rapid reversal in New Zealand's legislation and an end to his business.

Biography

Bowden was born 10 June 1971 in Auckland, New Zealand. His father was an internet pioneer and his mother was a piano teacher. He studied guitar under Nigel Gavin and played in Gavin's acoustic avant garde jazz ensemble "Gitbox Rebellion." At 18, after studying music at Auckland University, Bowden joined Auckland metal band "The Highwaymen" on lead guitar. Together the band recorded a first album "Torrent of Darkness. After a break-up Bowden played eclectic guitar solos on drummer Gavin Stokes' album Continuum, and worked as a guitar teacher for 7 years.

Matt Bowden went on to become one of the original creators and distributors of party pills. After the death of a family member from ecstasy overdose Bowden worked with a neuropharmacologist and biopsychologist to develop demonstrably safer alternatives to methamphetamine to be used as a substitute therapy.

Lobbying

Following a friend's death, Bowden contracted a research team to identify safer alternatives to illicit substances and identified benzylpiperazine from research and began dialogue with New Zealand's Ministry of Health Drug Policy Team, identifying himself as a community member with a potential solution for drug demand reduction as called for in methamphetamine action plan.

Products were developed for amphetamine addicts and initially targeted toward them as a substitute therapy.

As popularity grew, the Inter-Agency Committee on Drugs (IACD) and the Ministerial Committee on Drug Policy (MCDP) funded research into usage of the products, that confirmed of those who used illegal drugs and party pills, 44.1% recently stopped using illegal drugs and 45.6% used party pills so they could avoid using illegal drugs.

A submission by Stargate International in April 2010 to the New Zealand Government, as part of their investigation into the control and regulation of drugs in New Zealand, was subsequently recommended by the Law Commission as part of a range of suggestions encompassing non-psychoactive "lifestyle" drugs such as aphrodisiacs, some cosmetics, and the wide and growing range of substances used in athletics and bodybuilding.

Following this Law Commission report, the New Zealand Government announced in September 2011 that they would follow the advice of the Law Commission and implement a new regulatory regime. The result of this amendment was the introduction of a "Class D" schedule, which moved to "restrict the sale of herbal highs or party pills to people over the age of 18…and places controls on marketing and labelling of the products."

Bowden led the lobbying activity regulations in lieu of prohibition and established an industry body, STANZ (Social Tonic Association of New Zealand) and developed a "Code of Practice" which became the default discussion document for what became the Misuse of Drugs Amendment Act, being the first of its kind of drug regulating legislation in the world. The Canadian Government has subsequently referenced this legislation and activity as a potential new direction in harm minimisation and drug regulation.

Bowden is planning to manufacture products that will pass the tests required by the Psychoactive Substances Bill, if it passes into law.

EASE

One of the most high-profile party pills products that Bowden developed was EASE.  Bowden's organisation Stargate International began 'clinical trials' to distribute EASE, later identified as methylone, after receiving confirmation from the New Zealand Ministry of Health that the product was legal to import and sell.

The initial advisement from the Ministry of Health stated:

Methylone is structurally and pharmacologically similar in some respects to the illegal and neurotoxic drug of abuse MDMA, although its structure falls outside the definition of "Amphetamine analogues" as defined in Part 7 of Schedule C of New Zealand’s Misuse of Drugs Act.

Following the screening of a locally produced documentary into EASE entitled The Truth Files, Associate Health Minister Jim Anderton released a statement classifying EASE as an illegal product, and provided the following assessment:

Yesterday, Associate Health Minister Jim Anderton said advice from the chair of the Expert Advisory Committee on Drugs, Dr Ashley Bloomfield, showed Ease contained a substance called methylone, an "analogue" – similar to – cathinone, which is a Class B amphetamine controlled under the Misuse of Drugs Act.

This announcement resulted in the termination of the trial, on the basis that although methylone was not explicitly scheduled and fell outside the strict definitions of an "amphetamine analogue" in the Misuse of Drugs Act, it was considered to be "substantially similar" to methcathinone and thus considered by law enforcement authorities to be a Class C illegal drug.

PB-22 and 5F-PB-22
Bowden's company Stargate International invented the synthetic cannabinoids PB-22 (QUPIC/SGT-21) and 5F-PB-22. PB-22 and 5F-PB-22 are credited with being the first synthetic cannabinoids to feature a quinoline substructure with an ester linker at the indole 3-position. No intellectual property protection was filed during development. PB-22 and 5F-PB-22 is illegal in both New Zealand and the United States.

Despite Bowden himself claiming that his cannabinoids were safe  PB-22 has been attributed to at least 4 deaths. and adverse medical events including a person and dog who had a seizure after consumption.

Starboy

Bowden's key musical persona 'Starboy' produces classically fused psychedelic rock music, using digital technology to create soundscapes and musical journeys. Receiving a great deal of publicity and media attention around his 40th birthday party, several hundred guests witnessed Starboy's first big outing.  It was, says Bowden "the birth of a new persona", a return to the long-dormant ambitions that saw him play in metal bands in his youth.

According to reports in the Sunday Star-Times, the event included, "women hanging from the ceiling on trapezes, others in bunny suits, loads of booze, and Bowden up on stage with his band amid lasers and costumed dancers, wearing Kiss-style makeup, big boots and long shiny coat, and evidently "enjoying himself much more than anyone else was".

Under the banner of 'Starboy', Bowden has released an eclectic range of progressive rock music, and a short film, entitled Starboy Eternity.  In media interviews he has described his persona as, "an interdimensional traveller... in time and space responding to the cries of this troubled earth... It's about raising consciousness and hope and freedom. About love. What the world needs". Other media interviews indicate that Bowden is likely to look offshore for his fanbase, as his role as de facto spokesman for the legal-high industry in New Zealand and changing personas has led to some discord.  Bowden states in an interview with the New Zealand Herald, "my market has to be overseas now, because in New Zealand the public don't like it if you've changed from one thing to something else."

Starboy's Eternity 

Starboy's Eternity is a 10-minute-3-second music video for Eternity  the song of the same name released in November 2011 and directed by Zac Blair.

Initially a stand-alone music video, the production has expanded into a three-part mini-movie that revolves around a young girl and her fight against the "Strangers" who have invaded her village. The films have been defined as Steampunk by reviewers.  Production began in November 2009 with shooting commencing June 2011 in various locations around Auckland, New Zealand.

Development 

In online articles and the extra features on the DVD, singer Matt Bowden elaborates on the concept behind the video.  He states, "the image of a child moving through a sleeping village came to him while he sung the lyrics in reaction to the funky bass line.  The song is about enlightenment and the lyrics borrowed from classical poetry so it suited that era, with the addition of sci-fi content and Zac Blair's direction."

Credits 

 Directed by: Zac Blair
 Edited by: Matt Alison
 Written by: Zac Blair and Matt Bowden

Starring

 Daughter: Shizzi Bowden
 Alchemist/Starboy: Matt Bowden
 Mother: Kristi Bowden
 Younger Daughter: Kezzi Bowden
 Stranger 1: Andrew Pether
 Stranger 2/Villager in forest: Craig Malyon
 Stranger 3: David Cotter
 Priest: Justin Bennett
 Burley Villager: Dallas Barnett

Discography

See also 
 PB-22
 5F-PB-22
 QUCHIC
 QUPIC
 SDB-001
 SDB-005
 Methylone

External links
 Hamilton's Pharmacopeia: The Synthetic Marijuana Steampunk Rock Opera

References

1971 births
Living people
New Zealand rock musicians
New Zealand expatriates in Thailand
New Zealand psychedelic drug advocates
Drug policy reform activists